Tamakushi-hime (玉櫛媛, タマクシヒメ) also known as Mishimanomizokui-hime (三嶋溝熾姫, ミシマノミゾクイヒメ) and Seyadatarahime (セヤダタラヒメ), is a feminine diety who appears in Japanese mythology.  She is known as the mother of Himetataraisuzu-hime, the first empress of Japan, a distant ancestor of the Miwa clan, Kamigamo the deity of Kamigamo Shrine. She is also known as Princess Mishima-Mizo, Seiyadatarahihime, Katsutamayori-biyorihime and Kimikahihime.

Her father is either Ōmononushi via an arrow as mentioned in the Kojiki and Nihon Shoki, or she is the daughter of Kotoshironushi when he took the form of a wani as only mentioned in the Nihon Shoki. Most of the Nihon Shoki mentions her as the daughter of Kotoshironushi..

Kojiki narrative 
According to the Kojiki Ōmononushi had taken the form of a red arrow and struck Seyadatara-hime's genitals while she was defecating in a ditch. She bore a daughter after she was impregnated by Ōmononushi, and that daughter was named  . Her name was later changed to Himetataraisuzu-hime and some other names to avoid the taboo word ).

Nihon Shoki narrative 
Like the Kojiki, the main narrative of the first volume of the Nihon Shoki first describes Himetataraisuzu-hime as the offspring of the god of Ōmononushi. However, the Nihon Shoki also contains an alternative story which portrays her as the child of the god  and the goddess  - also known as  - conceived after Kotoshironushi transformed himself into a gigantic wani and had sex with her. Likewise, the main narrative in the third and fourth volumes of Nihon Shoki refer to her as the daughter of Kotoshironushi rather than Ōmononushi.

Related topics 
 List of Japanese deities

References 

 
 

History of Osaka Prefecture
History of Kyoto Prefecture
Japanese goddesses
Pages with unreviewed translations
Kunitsukami